is an underground metro station located in Tempaku-ku, Nagoya, Aichi Prefecture, Japan operated by the Nagoya Municipal Subway's Tsurumai Line. It is located 18.4 rail kilometers from the terminus of the Tsurumai Line at Kami-Otai Station.

History
Hara Station was opened on 1 October 1978.

Lines

 (Station number: T18)

Layout
Hara Station has two underground opposed side platforms. The platforms are as follows:

The station has a small public arts gallery that features rotating exhibitions. In the hallway towards the turnstiles a large mosaic of a mountain is featured.

Located next to the exits is a bus terminal.

Platforms

References

External links

 Hara Station official web site 

Railway stations in Japan opened in 1978
Railway stations in Aichi Prefecture